The FAI Intermediate Cup, also known as the FAI Umbro Intermediate Cup and the Pat O'Brien Intermediate Challenge Cup, is a cup competition organized by the Football Association of Ireland for intermediate association football clubs from the Republic of Ireland. These include clubs competing in the Leinster Senior League, the Munster Senior League and the Ulster Senior League. It was originally known as the FAI Qualifying Cup and from the beginning it has been used as a qualifying competition for the senior FAI Cup. It is currently sponsored by Umbro and has previously been sponsored by Carlsberg.

History

FAI Qualifying Cup
The competition was originally known as the FAI Qualifying Cup before it was renamed the FAI Intermediate Cup at the start of the 1931–32 season. The cup's first winners were Drumcondra who beat Cobh Ramblers in the inaugural 1926–27 final. Drumcondra, who at the time were playing in the Leinster Senior League, subsequently went onto complete a cup double when they defeated Brideville 1–0 in the 1926–27 FAI Cup final. The competition continues to act a qualifying competition for the FAI Cup with clubs who reach the Round of Sixteen being invited to compete in the senior cup.

League of Ireland
In addition to being the inaugural winners, Drumcondra were also the first of several future League of Ireland clubs to win the FAI Intermediate Cup. Cork Bohemians, Sligo Rovers, Longford Town, UCD, Cobh Ramblers, St Patricks Athletic, Albert Rovers, Bray Wanderers, Home Farm and Cork Hibernians, playing as AOH, all subsequently won the cup before joining the national league. Athlone Town were also finalists on one occasion. Jacobs, St. James's Gate and Transport all won the cup after leaving the League of Ireland. With five wins, Longford Town were the competitions most successful club until Bluebell United equalled their record in 1999–2000 and Avondale United surpassed it in 2013–14. The reserve teams of League of Ireland clubs have also won the cup on several occasions. These include Bohemians, Shelbourne, Drumcondra and St Patrick's Athletic. Limerick B and UCD Reserves were also runners up.

2000s and 2010s
During the 2000s and 2010s Avondale United and Crumlin United have been the cup's most successful clubs. In 2013–14 Avondale United became only the second club after Distillery to win the cup four times in a row. In 2012 the FAI introduced a new cup, the Tom Hand Memorial Cup, which saw the winners of the FAI Intermediate Cup play off against the winners of the FAI Junior Cup. Avondale United won the inaugural match, defeating Sheriff Y.C. 2–1 at the AUL Complex.
In 2014 it was announced that future finals would be hosted at the Aviva Stadium. The 2014–15 and 2015–16 finals were both played as double headers along with the FAI Junior Cup finals.

Finals

Notes

List of winners by club

References

 
3
2
1926 establishments in Ireland